Li Qiangfen was a Chinese diplomat. He was Ambassador of the People's Republic of China to South Yemen (1968–1972), Zambia (1972–1977) and East Germany (1982–1984).

Ambassadors of China to South Yemen
Ambassadors of China to Zambia
Ambassadors of China to East Germany
Possibly living people